Colobometridae is a family of crinoids belonging to the order Comatulida. Members of this order are known as feather stars.

Genera
Genera within this family include:
 Alisometra A.H. Clark, 1947
 Analcidometra A.H. Clark, 1918
 Austrometra A.H. Clark, 1916
 Basilometra A.H. Clark, 1936
 Cenometra A.H. Clark, 1911
 Clarkometra Gislén, 1922
 Colobometra A.H. Clark, 1909
 Cotylometra A.H. Clark, 1916
 Cyllometra A.H. Clark, 1907
 Decametra A.H. Clark, 1911
 Embryometra Gislén, 1938
 Epimetra A.H. Clark, 1911
 Gislenometra A.H. Clark, 1947
 Iconometra A.H. Clark, 1929
 Oligometra A.H. Clark, 1908
 Oligometrides A.H. Clark, 1918
 Petasometra A.H. Clark, 1912
 Pontiometra A.H. Clark, 1907

References

 
Comatulida
Echinoderm families